Samuel Sloan may refer to:

 Samuel Sloan (architect) (1815–1884), Philadelphia-based architect and author of architecture books
 Samuel Sloan (railroad executive) (1817–1907), American politician and businessman, president of the Delaware, Lackawanna & Western Railroad
 Sam Sloan (Samuel Howard Sloan, born 1944), American chess player and publisher